A coolant pump is a type of pump used to recirculate a coolant, generally a liquid, that is used to transfer heat away from an engine or other device that generates heat as a byproduct of producing energy.

Common applications of coolant pumps are:

 Coolant pump or water pump, found in most modern internal combustion engine applications such as most fossil fuel powered vehicles
 Coolant pumps, found in pressurized water reactors, a type of light water reactor used in the majority of Western world nuclear power plants

Pumps
Cooling technology